is a Japanese badminton player affiliated with the Biprogy team.

Achievements

Asian Championships 
Women's doubles

BWF World Tour (1 title, 2 runners-up) 
The BWF World Tour, which was announced on 19 March 2017 and implemented in 2018, is a series of elite badminton tournaments sanctioned by the Badminton World Federation (BWF). The BWF World Tour is divided into levels of World Tour Finals, Super 1000, Super 750, Super 500, Super 300 (part of the HSBC World Tour), and the BWF Tour Super 100.

Women's doubles

BWF International Challenge/Series (3 titles) 
Women's doubles

  BWF International Challenge tournament
  BWF International Series tournament

References

External links 
 

1995 births
Living people
Sportspeople from Kanagawa Prefecture
Japanese female badminton players
21st-century Japanese women